Iron bromide is a compound which comprises iron and bromine:

 Iron(II) bromide, ferrous bromide
 Iron(III) bromide, ferric bromide